Clostridium liquoris is a strictly anaerobic, Gram-positive, rod-shaped, spore-forming and non-motile bacterium from the genus of Clostridium.

References

 

Bacteria described in 2016
liquoris